Sar-Tov Stadium (Itztadion Sar-Tov), commonly known as HaKufsa (lit. The Box) was a football stadium in Netanya, Israel. It was used mostly for football matches and was the home stadium of Maccabi Netanya. It is set to be demolished to make way for a new housing development after Maccabi Netanya moved to the new Netanya Stadium.

Inauguration of the Stadium
The stadium was inaugurated in August, 1943 against FK Naša Krila Zemun. The game, held in front of a full stadium, ended in a 1-1 draw with Yitzhak Casspi scoring the first goal for Netanya.

The Nickname
The official name was the "Sar-Tov Stadium", named in honor of Joseph Sar-Tov, who was one of the founders of Maccabi Netanya and served as the first chairman of the club. Over the years the stadium was dubbed as "HaKufsa" ("The Box"), the nickname comes from the relatively small size of the ground and being surrounded by stands in the manner reminiscent of a box.

References

Defunct football venues in Israel
Maccabi Netanya F.C.
Sport in Netanya
Sports venues in Central District (Israel)